The Leibniz-Forschungsinstitut für Molekulare Pharmakologie (FMP) is a research institute in the Leibniz Association, focussing on proteins as basic structures of cellular organisms. It is one of the large number of research institutions based in Berlin. The institute is situated on a research campus in Buch, a northern district of Berlin. Legally, the FMP and seven other Leibniz Institutes based in Berlin are represented by the Forschungsverbund Berlin (Research Association of Berlin).

The institute has around 270 employees, including researchers and administrative staff.

Research Areas 
The Institute focuses on fundamental research in life sciences, with an interdisciplinary approach based on chemistry and biology. The institute is organized into three departments under the broad umbrella of molecular pharmacology:

 Molecular physiology and cell biology
 Structural biology
 Chemical biology

Collaborations 
The institute has many collaborations with national and international universities and research institutes, as well as businesses. Collaboration partners include:

 Free University, Berlin, Germany
 Max Delbrück Center for Molecular Medicine, Berlin, Germany
 European Molecular Biology Laboratory, Heidelberg, Germany
 Hannover Medical School, Hannover, Germany
 University of Potsdam, Potsdam, Germany
 Hospital for Sick Children, Canada
 Université Paris Diderot, France
 INSERM, France
 University of Melbourne, Australia
 University of Geneva, Switzerland
 Schering AG

Funding 
The Institute receives core and external funding. The core funding (Grundfinanzierung) is usually split equally between federal and state contributions. In 2012, the institute had a total revenue of 21 million euros, excluding DFG fees.

History 
The institute was founded in 1992 as a successor to the "Institut für Wirkstofforschung" (Institute for Active Materials Research, also translated as the Drugs Research Institute), an Institute of the Academy of Sciences of the GDR. The Institut für Wirkstofforschung was founded in 1977 by Peter Oehme, who also served as its first and only director, and had around 230 employees. After the reunification of Germany, scientific institutions underwent a period of readjustment to align those in the former east and west. In 1991, the German Council of Science and Humanities (Wissenschaftsrat) recommended the founding of an institute focused in the area of molecular pharmacology, which led to the establishment of the institute as it is known today.

The institute was originally located in Friedrichsfelde in east Berlin, but moved to its current location in Buch in 2000.

Since the founding of the institute, it has been a member of the Leibniz Association. The Institute does not have an official English name, and the acronym "FMP" was used heavily. From 2006, the institute was named Leibniz-Institut für Molekulare Pharmakologie (Leibniz Institute for Molecular Pharmacology), though the institute logo still contained the "FMP" acronym. In May 2017, it was renamed back to "Leibniz-Forschungsinstitut für Molekulare Pharmakologie" (Leibniz Research Institute for Molecular Pharmacology).

Directors of the FMP 

 1996-2008: Walter Rosenthal
 2009-2011: Hartmut Oschkinat (acting director)
 2012–present: Volker Haucke
 2015–present: Dorothea Fiedler

References

External links

 

Leibniz Association
Buildings and structures in Berlin
Molecular biology institutes
Research institutes established in 1992